Allohumibacter is a Gram-positive, aerobic and short rod-shaped species of bacteria from the family of Microbacteriaceae which has been isolated from the roots of the plant Artemisia princeps.

References

Microbacteriaceae
Bacteria described in 2016
Monotypic bacteria genera